The 1994 UEFA Champions League final was a football match between Italian club Milan and Spanish club Barcelona, played on 18 May 1994 at the Olympic Stadium in Athens, Greece.

Barcelona were favourites to win their second European Cup/UEFA Champions League in three years, having just won La Liga for the fourth year in a row. Milan's preparation before the final was in disarray: legendary striker Marco van Basten was still out with a long-term injury, and £13 million young sensation Gianluigi Lentini (then world's most expensive footballer) was also injured; sweeper and captain, Franco Baresi was suspended, as was defender Alessandro Costacurta; and UEFA regulations at the time that limited teams to fielding a maximum of three non-nationals meant that coach Fabio Capello was forced to leave out Florin Răducioiu, Jean-Pierre Papin and Brian Laudrup. On Barcelona's side, the rule saw Johan Cruyff choosing not to pick Michael Laudrup in his squad for the final which caused Capello to state after the game: "Laudrup was the guy I feared but Cruyff left him out, and that was his mistake". Laudrup left Barcelona for their arch-rival, Real Madrid, at the end of the season.

Milan played in their all-white away strip, which historically they use in finals of the European Cup/UEFA Champions League, while Barcelona played in their red and blue strip. Milan dominated early and were rewarded when Dejan Savićević ran down the right flank and passed to Daniele Massaro, who tapped the ball into an empty net. Massaro banged in his second just before half-time to make it 2–0 after a solo run by Roberto Donadoni down the left wing.

In the 47th minute, Savićević capitalised on a defensive error by Miguel Ángel Nadal to lob goalkeeper Andoni Zubizarreta for the third goal. Eight minutes later, after Savićević had hit a post and the Barcelona defence had failed to clear, Milan midfielder Marcel Desailly beat the offside trap to make it 4–0, which ended up being the final score. Desailly became the first player to win the trophy in consecutive years with different clubs after winning with Marseille in 1993.

Teams
In the following table, finals until 1992 were in the European Cup era, since 1993 were in the UEFA Champions League era.

Road to the final

Match

Details

See also
1989 European Super Cup – contested between same teams
A.C. Milan in European football
FC Barcelona in international football competitions

References

External links
European Cup results at Rec.Sport.Soccer Statistics Foundation
1993–94 season at UEFA website

Champions
UEFA
European Cup Final 1994
European Cup Final 1994
1994
Final
UEFA Champions League finals
May 1994 sports events in Europe
Sports competitions in Athens
1990s in Athens